Alison Bailey is a New Zealand farm management academic researching the economics of farming.

Bailey completed both her undergraduate studies and PhD at University of Wales, Aberystwyth. After completing her PhD, she worked at Scottish Agricultural College, Edinburgh, University of Reading and Cranfield University. Appointed in 2015, she is currently professor of farm management at Lincoln University.

References

External links
 institutional homepage

Living people
Year of birth missing (living people)
New Zealand women academics
Academics of Cranfield University
Academics of the University of Reading
Academic staff of the Lincoln University (New Zealand)